Robert Honywood (6 April 1825 – 25 December 1870) was an English first-class cricketer.

The son of the politician William Philip Honywood, he was born at Marks Hall in Essex in April 1825. He was educated at Eton College, before going up to Trinity College, Oxford. While studying at Oxford, he played first-class cricket for Oxford University from 1845–47, making seven appearances. He scored 88 runs in his seven appearances, at an average of 6.76 and a high score of 18. Honywood died at Westminster in December 1870.

References

External links

1825 births
1870 deaths
People from Coggeshall
People educated at Eton College
Alumni of Trinity College, Oxford
English cricketers
Oxford University cricketers